Messas is a commune in the Loiret department in north-central France.

The parish church is dedicated to Saint Sebastien.

See also
Communes of the Loiret department

References

Communes of Loiret